"Runaway" is a number-one Billboard Hot 100 song made famous by Del Shannon in 1961. It was written by Shannon and keyboardist Max Crook, and became a major international hit. It was No. 472 on the 2010 version of Rolling Stones list of the 500 Greatest Songs of All Time and No. 466 on the 2004 version.

Original recording
Singer-guitarist Charles Westover and keyboard player Max Crook performed together as members of "Charlie Johnson and the Big Little Show Band" in Battle Creek, Michigan, before their group won a recording contract in 1960.  Westover took the new stage name "Del Shannon", and Crook, who had invented his own clavioline-based electric keyboard called a Musitron, became "Maximilian".

After their first recording session for Big Top Records in New York City had ended in failure, their manager Ollie McLaughlin persuaded them to rewrite and re-record an earlier song they had written, "Little Runaway", to highlight Crook's unique instrumental sound. On January 21, 1961, they recorded "Runaway" at Bell Sound Studios in New York City, with Harry Balk as producer, Fred Weinberg as audio engineer and also session musicians on several sections: session musician Al Caiola on guitar, Moe Wechsler on piano, and Crook playing the central Musitron break. Other musicians on the record included Al Casamenti and Bucky Pizzarelli on guitar, Milt Hinton on bass, and Joe Marshall on drums. Bill Ramall, who was the arranger for the session, also played baritone sax.  After recording in A minor, producer Balk sped up the recording to pitch just below a B-flat minor. "Runaway" was released in February 1961 and was immediately successful. On April 10 of that year, Shannon appeared on Dick Clark's American Bandstand, helping to catapult it to the number one spot on the Billboard Hot 100, where it remained for four weeks. Two months later, it reached number one on the UK's Record Retailer chart, spending three weeks in that position. On Billboards Hot R&B Sides, "Runaway" peaked at number three.

The song was ranked No. 5 on Billboards end of year "Hot 100 for 1961 – Top Sides of the Year" and No. 9 on Cash Boxs "Top 100 Chart Hits of 1961".

Chart performance

Weekly charts

Year-end charts

All-time charts

Other recordings
Del Shannon re-recorded "Runaway" in 1967, intended for his album Home and Away (shelved until 2006), with John Paul Jones, Nicky Hopkins and Jimmy Page as session musicians. This version was issued as a single, and reached No. 122 on Billboards Bubbling Under the Hot 100 and reached the Top 20 in Australia.

Shannon re-recorded the song a second time in 1986, this time as the theme music for the NBC television series Crime Story, which starred Dennis Farina and was set in the early 1960s. This version featured new lyrics to make the song more fitting for a crime drama.

Shannon appeared on Late Night With David Letterman on February 10, 1987, performing "Runaway" with Paul Shaffer and the World's Most Dangerous Band. Letterman introduced Shannon as having sold as many as 80,000 singles of "Runaway" per day at its peak in popularity.

The best-known original version is in mono. However, in subsequent compilations a different take from the same recording sessions is available in stereo.

Lyrics
The song is sung from the point of view of a man whose girlfriend has left him. She is mostly referred to in the third person, but she is briefly addressed in the second person in the lyric "wishin' you were here by me".

Covers
In 1962, an instrumental version was released by Lawrence Welk and His Orchestra. Welk's version spent 6 weeks on the Billboard Hot 100 chart, reaching No. 56, while reaching No. 5 in Hong Kong, and No. 8 on Canada's CHUM Hit Parade.
A version by the Small Faces was released on From the Beginning in June 1967.
Elvis Presley covered the song while performing at the International Hotel in Las Vegas in August 1969, appearing on the album On Stage. During Presley's August 26, 1969 Midnight Show, Presley performed "Runaway" and then introduced Del Shannon in the audience. This performance was later released on Collector's Gold. Years later, Shannon would relate this story to Bob Costas on his late night television program Later With Bob Costas.
Austin Roberts recorded a medley of this song and The Beau Brummels song "Just a Little" on the Philips Records label in 1970.
"Vanina" reached No. 1 in France and No. 27 in Flanders. Dave also covered the song in German in 1975 ("Mein Mädchen Monika") and Spanish ("Vanesa"). In 2011, he released a soul version of "Vanina" on the album Blue Eyed Soul, along with a music video, that reached No. 90 in France.
In 1975, Charlie Kulis, a schoolteacher from New York, released a cover version on Playboy Records. Promotion for the single included an appearance on American Bandstand. Kulis's version spent eight weeks on the U.S. Billboard Hot 100, reaching No. 46, while reaching No. 40 on Billboards Easy Listening chart.
In 1976, Lee Jackson, a Brazilian band, included a slow rock samba version of the song on her album Bill Haley Presents Lee Jackson - Rock Samba
In 1977, Bonnie Raitt included a bluesy version of the song on her album Sweet Forgiveness. Also released as a single, it reached No. 57 on the U.S. Billboard Hot 100.
Narvel Felts covered the song in 1978 and took it to No. 30 on the Hot Country Singles charts.
In 1986, Shannon was asked if the song could be used for Crime Story, an NBC TV series set in early-1960s Las Vegas. Shannon agreed, re-recording it with slightly different lyrics.
 In 1986, Luis Cardenas, lead singer of the rock band Renegade, reached No. 83 on the US Billboard Hot 100 with his cover version, which is best remembered for its live action/animated video that features cameo appearances by Del Shannon and Donny Osmond.
In 1987, Swedish pop legend Fredrik Willstrand recorded a cover version for his eponymous album.
 The supergroup Traveling Wilburys recorded a version of the song, with Jeff Lynne singing lead vocals; it was released on a 2007 CD reissue of Traveling Wilburys Vol. 3.
Australian artist Ed Kuepper included a 10-minute live version of the song on The Aints 1991 album S.L.S.Q – Very Live!
A cover by Gary Allan reached No. 74 on the Hot Country Singles & Tracks chart in 2000, despite not being officially released as a single.
Australian group 3 Piece Suite covered it in 2002; it rose to No. 54 on the ARIA charts.
US punk band Misfits covered "Runaway" on their 2003 album Project 1950.
The joint venture of Los Coronas and Arizona Baby covered the song in their 2011 live album Dos Bandas y un Destino.
English rock band Kasabian covered the song on the album Dermot O'Leary Presents the Saturday Sessions 2011.
American heavy metal band Avenged Sevenfold covered the song with The Vandals guitarist Warren Fitzgerald on the deluxe edition of their album The Stage.

In popular culture 
The song was used in the 1973 movie American Graffiti, Crime Story (American TV series) 1986 TV series as opening theme, the 2020 film Siberia, and multiple times in the Showtime miniseries Dexter: New Blood, including an episode with the same title as the song.

Tom Petty mentions the song in his 1989 song "Runnin' Down a Dream". Similarly, Barenaked Ladies mention "Runaway" in their song "When You Dream", from the 1998 album Stunt.

Genesis included the lyric "my little runaway", sung to the same melody as in Shannon's song, in their song "In the Cage", from the album The Lamb Lies Down on Broadway. It is one of many references to hit songs from the 1960s on the album.

Echo & the Bunnymen quote the lyrics "I'm walking in the rain, to end this misery", sung to the same melody as in Shannon's song, in their song "Over The Wall", from the album Heaven Up Here.

The song can also be heard playing in the background of the mechanic shop on Goodwill Hunting. Also in the car ride in a scene in Eddie and the Cruisers.

See also
List of Hot 100 number-one singles of 1961 (U.S.)
List of number-one singles from the 1960s (UK)

References

External links
The Making of "Runaway"

1961 debut singles
Del Shannon songs
The Beach Boys songs
Bonnie Raitt songs
Narvel Felts songs
Gary Allan songs
Billboard Hot 100 number-one singles
Cashbox number-one singles
Number-one singles in New Zealand
UK Singles Chart number-one singles
Grammy Hall of Fame Award recipients
Songs about loneliness
Songs written by Del Shannon
Music videos directed by John Lloyd Miller
1961 songs
London Records singles
Eruption (band) songs